The Centre hospitalier intercommunal de Poissy-Saint-Germain-en-Laye is a celebrated teaching hospital in Poissy and Saint Germain en Laye. Part of the Assistance Publique – Hôpitaux de Paris and a teaching hospital of Versailles Saint-Quentin-en-Yvelines University.

It has been created in 1997.

References

External links
Centre hospitalier intercommunal de Poissy-Saint-Germain-en-Laye

Hospitals in Île-de-France
Hospital buildings completed in 1997
Hospital buildings completed in the 20th century
Teaching hospitals in France
Buildings and structures in Île-de-France
Hospitals established in 1997
1997 establishments in France
20th-century architecture in France